Robert Michael James (born 2 October 1934) is a former English cricketer who played first-class cricket from 1956 to 1965.

Cricket career
Michael James was educated at St John's School, Leatherhead, and Trinity College, Cambridge. He was a regular member of the Cambridge University team from 1956 to 1958, scoring 1969 runs in 45 first-class matches at an average of 27.34. His highest score was 168 against Gloucestershire in 1957, when he "dominated the cricket, on-driving and pulling powerfully during a fine display lasting four hours and including six 6's and seventeen 4's". Cambridge won the match by an innings in two days.

He also played regularly for Berkshire in the Minor Counties Championship from 1954 to 1962, and a few matches from 1969 to 1971.

James played three matches for Wellington in the Plunket Shield in 1964–65.

His son Tim played for Berkshire in the 1980s.

References

External links

1934 births
Living people
English cricketers
Cambridge University cricketers 
Berkshire cricketers
Wellington cricketers
Marylebone Cricket Club cricketers
Minor Counties cricketers
Free Foresters cricketers
Alumni of Trinity College, Cambridge
People educated at St John's School, Leatherhead